Andrologia is a bimonthly peer-reviewed medical journal covering andrology. It was established in 1969 as Andrologie, obtaining its current name in 1974. It is published by Wiley-Blackwell, and the editors-in-chief are Wolf-Bernhard Schill (University of Giessen) and Ralf Henkel (University of the Western Cape). According to the Journal Citation Reports, the journal has a 2016 impact factor of 1.458, ranking it 3rd out of 5 journals in the category "Andrology".

References

External links

Publications established in 1969
Wiley-Blackwell academic journals
Andrology journals
Bimonthly journals
English-language journals